The Caballos Formation (KI) is a geological formation of the Upper Magdalena Valley (VSM), Caguán-Putumayo Basin, Central and Eastern Ranges of the Colombian Andes.

Etymology 
The formation was defined and named in 1967 by Corrigan after Cerro Caballos, to the west of Olaya Herrera, Tolima.

Description

Lithologies 
The upper part of the formation contains conglomerates and glauconitic sandstones.

Stratigraphy and depositional environment 
The Caballos Formation in some parts concordantly overlies the Yaví Formation and in other parts rests unconformably on the Saldaña Formation and Ibagué Batholith. The formation is overlain by the Hondita Formation. The age has been estimated to be Aptian to Albian. Stratigraphically, the formation is time equivalent with the Une, Aguardiente, Simijaca, El Peñón, Capotes, Tablazo, Tibú-Mercedes and Pacho Formations. The formation has been deposited in a fluvial to estuarine and shallow marine environment.

The Caballos Formation is a source, reservoir and seal rock in the Upper Magdalena Valley, and a source and reservoir rock in the Caguán-Putumayo Basin. The Orito and Moqueta Fields of the latter basin produce from Caballos reservoirs.

Fossil content 
The formation has provided fossils of Heminautilus etheringtoni, Araucarites sp., Brachyphyllum sp., Cladophlebis sp., and Weichselia sp., as well as many types of pollen.

Outcrops 

The Caballos Formation is apart from its type locality, found in Huila, Tolima and Putumayo Departments.

Regional correlations

See also 
 List of fossiliferous stratigraphic units in Colombia
 Geology of the Eastern Hills
 Geology of the Altiplano Cundiboyacense

Notes

References

Bibliography

Maps 
 
 
 
 
 
 
 
 
 
 
 
 
 
 
 
 
 
 
 
 
 
 
 
 

Geologic formations of Colombia
Cretaceous Colombia
Lower Cretaceous Series of South America
Albian Stage
Aptian Stage
Sandstone formations
Shale formations
Siltstone formations
Limestone formations
Coal formations
Fluvial deposits
Shallow marine deposits
Source rock formations
Reservoir rock formations
Seal rock formations
Fossiliferous stratigraphic units of South America
Paleontology in Colombia
Formations
Formations
Formations